The 2005–06 Vijay Hazare Trophy was the fourth season of the Vijay Hazare Trophy, a List A cricket tournament in India. It was contested between 27 domestic cricket teams of India, starting in February and finishing in April 2006. In the final, Railways beat Uttar Pradesh by 20 runs to win their maiden title.

References

External links
 Series home at ESPN Cricinfo

Vijay Hazare Trophy
Vijay Hazare Trophy